Harriet Chung is an actress, singer, and dancer. She was born in Hong Kong and studied dance at the Hong Kong Academy of Performing Arts and was a member of the Hong Kong Children's Choir and Yip's Children's Choir.

She moved to Canada to further her dance training at the National Ballet of Canada. She has danced professionally with the Empire State Ballet, Ontario Ballet Theatre, Xing Dance Theatre among others.

She broke into musical theatre with a featured role in the world premiere production of Tiananmen Dreams.  Immediately afterwards she joined the Toronto cast of The Phantom of the Opera.  She left the show to join the German production of Cats in Hamburg. She then returned to Canada and returned for the final year of the Toronto production of The Phantom of the Opera.

She has since appeared in many musicals such as several productions of The King & I, Iron Road, Starbright, Fiddler on Fire.  Chung played the lead role in the opening musical at the 2006 Miss Chinese Toronto Pageant and was a featured performer at the 2014 Mandarin Profile Awards. She was nominated for an Ovation Theatre Award for Outstanding Choreography for her work in the Gateway Theatre production of The King & I in Vancouver, British Columbia.

Golden Lotus

Chung received critical acclaim when she starred in the world premiere of the musical Golden Lotus in Hong Kong in September, 2014. "The show’s greatest strength perhaps lies in Harriet Chung, who plays the eponymous character, and carries the show ... Ms. Chung’s face is fluid as water: in between the many scenes in which Golden Lotus transforms, transcends, or transgresses into another person, her face changes seamlessly like a Bian Lian artist. The metamorphosis of her from being a victim of the Song Dynasty’s corrupt political scene to a player within it carries conviction, and is convincing, mainly because Ms. Chung also dextrously articulates the grammar of body language with great clarity. Her voice is always flexible, ranging from the sweet, cuddly voice of an innocent housewife, to a skin-crawling, creepy scream of a girl who has just lost her innocence." Chung was nominated for a Hong Kong English Drama Award for Best Actress (Hecklers Award) for her portrayal of the title character. Chung also appears in the musical film of Golden Lotus, released in September, 2021, and has won the Best Actor & Director Award (New York) for Best Actress in a Musical and the Only The Best International Film Award for Best Actress (Special Award).

Recordings

Chung is featured in the title role of Golden Lotus in the album Golden Lotus: Sounds from the Musical.  She appears in three tracks on the album for the songs, A World Away, As Each Day Goes By and A World Away (Reprise).

A newly arranged single of A World Away, from the musical Golden Lotus, titled A World Away (Remix) was sung by Chung and released on August 25, 2020. The single was critically praised and won Best Original Song at the Hollywood Gold Awards.  The music video produced by George Chiang and directed by Theresa Kowall-Shipp has won over a dozen Best Music Video awards internationally. Chung's performance in the music video also and also garnered Chung a Best Actress award by the Only The Best International Film Awards in Miami.

Awards and nominations

Music and music videos

Film

Theatre

References

Hong Kong female dancers
21st-century Hong Kong actresses
Year of birth missing (living people)
Living people